Rags2Riches (R2R) is a social enterprise that was established in 2007 and is based in the Philippines. R2R’s contributions to society lie mainly in its endeavours to alleviate poverty in Payatas, Quezon City. Statistics from the National Statistical Coordination Board of the Philippines show that Quezon City has the highest incidence of poverty in the region it lies in and the figures are also much higher than the national average. R2R works with women from these poor communities in Payatas to increase their levels of income and bring them out of poverty.

A program to help achieve their mission is currently in force. The Rags2Riches Project creates income opportunities and financial security for these impoverished women. R2R assists in this by linking them and their hand-made rugs directly to retailers across the Philippines.  The focuses of this program have been on the women’s ability to produce hand-made rugs, on imparting knowledge to them so that they can produce more value-added products, and on building up the confidence and solidarity among themselves.

Income levels of the women have risen tremendously. Statistics from Worldsalaries.org shows that the income level of the women is comparable to other professions in the Philippines.  

A potential obstacle in raising income levels to fight poverty is that help is only rendered to a handful of people due to a lack of reach. R2R assisted in the process of pushing the products made by the women into the top-end of the market.  The in-demand products allow for an increase in the reach of the project. The Rags2Riches Project is expected to impact 5,000 women in the next 5 years, an increase from a few hundred today. In addition, another project will be focusing on the development and creation of new products that could be made from the rugs that the women produce. This will be done through the establishment of the R2R Innovation and Social Entrepreneurship Centre.

Apart from addressing the issue of income poverty, R2R has embarked on various programs to develop the women as individuals who can function better in society. R2R has a program which imparts business and life skills to the women. This includes areas such as personal finance, health insurance and nutrition. Another project comes in the form of a compulsory savings scheme to be used for social security, education or healthcare in future.

R2R has also teamed up with various organizations to influence decision-makers in the global area of social entrepreneurship, innovation and human progress. For example, R2R shared its beliefs and vision in solving global developmental issues using the World Entrepreneurship Forum Singapore 2011 as a platform.

References

" 
Organizations based in Metro Manila
"